Francesco Longo Mancini (1880–1954) was an Italian painter of the early 20th century who was known for his paintings of nudes. He was born in Catania where he lived part of his life. He died in Rome. He signed his paintings "F. Longo Mancini".

Works

The Unexpected Visitor
Nudo di Donna
La Ragazza di Rosa
The Red Shoes

References

19th-century Italian painters
Italian male painters
20th-century Italian painters
1880 births
1954 deaths
19th-century Italian male artists
20th-century Italian male artists